This list of mountains of Queen Maud Land contains mountains with a registered elevation of higher than 2000 metres (6561 feet) above sea level. The availability of accurate data for this region is limited, making the list both incomplete and inaccurate. Prominence data is generally not available, and the list includes rock formations such as mountain peaks, ridges, nunataks, cliffs and crags. Ice domes are not included in the list.

With an elevation of ,s Jøkulkyrkja Mountain is the highest mountain of Queen Maud Land. According to the United States Geological Survey (USGS) database Geographic Names Information System (GNIS) and other sources, several summits in the Sør Rondane Mountains are registered with higher elevation, including Isachsen Mountain (3,425 metres), Devold Peak (3,280 meters), Kjelbotn Peak (3,210 meters), Bond Peaks (3,180 meters) and Mount Widerøe (3,180 meters). According to Belgian sources and Norwegian topographic maps, the highest elevation of Sør Rondane Mountains is just below 3000 m.a.s.l.

References 

 
Mountains of Queen Maud Land, List
Queen Maud Land